Soome may refer to:

Soome, Estonia, a village
The name for Finland in the Estonian language